Limnichinae is a subfamily of minute marsh-loving beetles in the family Limnichidae. There are more than 20 genera and 330 described species in Limnichinae.

Genera
These 24 genera belong to the subfamily Limnichinae:

 Afrolimnichus Delève, 1968
 Bothriophorus Mulsant & Rey, 1852
 Byrrhinus Motschulsky, 1858
 Caccothryptus Sharp, 1902
 Chibidoronus Satô, 1966
 Corrinea Wooldridge, 1980
 Cyclolimnichus Delève, 1968
 Eulimnichus Casey, 1889
 Euthryptus Sharp, 1902
 Geolimnichus Hernando & Ribera, 2003
 Lichminus Casey, 1889
 Limnichites Casey, 1889
 Limnichoderus Casey, 1889
 Limnichomorphus Pic, 1922
 Limnichus Latreille, 1829
 Mandersia Sharp, 1902
 Paralimnichus Delève, 1973
 Pelochares Mulsant & Rey, 1869
 Phalacrichus Sharp, 1902
 Physemus LeConte, 1854
 Platypelochares Champion, 1923
 Resachus Delève, 1968
 Simplocarina Pic, 1922
 Tricholimnichus Hernando & Ribera, 2001

References

Further reading

 
 
 

Limnichidae
Articles created by Qbugbot
Beetle subfamilies